Šanac is a village north of the town of Kruševac. It is situated along the left bank of the river Zapadna Morava. The name Šanac is derived from the Serbian word for trench after the trenches built on the hill above the village to defend against the Ottomans. Until the Second Serbian Uprising in 1815, the village was part of Ottoman Serbia.

References 

Kruševac
Populated places in Rasina District